Ma'an (Mandarin: 马鞍镇) is a town in Zizhong County, Neijiang, Sichuan, China. In 2010, Ma'an had a total population of 27,402: 14,391 males and 13,011 females: 4,755 aged under 14, 19,530 aged between 15 and 65 and 3,117 aged over 65.

References 

Towns in Sichuan
Zizhong County